Brandon Mitchell may refer to:

 Brandon Mitchell (defensive end) (born 1975), former NFL defensive end
 Brandon Mitchell (safety) (born 1983), former NFL safety
 Brandon Mitchell (politician), American businessman and member of the Idaho House of Representative